David Holt is an English voice actor and writer. He has contributed his voice to a wide variety of children's cartoons.

Career

Voice acting
Holt is noted for his role as Vervain in Watership Down as well as the voices for the male animals in Percy the Park Keeper, Oakie Doke and other voices in Oakie Doke, Cowboy, Policeman, farm animals, and Robin Hood in A Town Called Panic, Dad in Angry Kid and Pinky in The Pinky and Perky Show. He has also done other voice work in animation, promos, documentaries, films, television, multi-media, computer games, children's toys, exhibition guides, announcements and audio books. He also has voiced commercials for L'Oreal Kids, Guess Who? and Burger King.
He had provided the voice to the UK version of Face from Nick Jr. from 1995 until September 2005, and Moose A. Moose from 2006 to 2010 for Noggin on TMF/VIVA and 2010 to 2013 for Nick Jr.
He played the voice of Jack Frost in the film Rainbow Magic: Return to Rainspell Island.

Writing
In his writing career, he has been writing for various radio or television productions like In the Name of the Wee Man, Cold Call, Tales From The Tower, Proof of the Pudding, Medium Rare and Beyond the Gravy.

Filmography

Film

Television

Video games

References

External links
 Official website
 

Living people
British male television writers
English male screenwriters
English male voice actors
English television writers
Place of birth missing (living people)
Year of birth missing (living people)